The 2021 Calypso Lemonade 200 was the 12th stock car race of the 2021 ARCA Menards Series season, the sixth race of the 2021 Sioux Chief Showdown, and the 26th iteration of the event. The race was held on Saturday, July 31, in Winchester, Indiana at Winchester Speedway, a  permanent, oval-shaped, high-banked racetrack. The race was extended from 200 laps to 205 laps due to a green–white–checker finish. After Corey Heim would spin within the closing laps of the race, Ty Gibbs would defend against a charging Greg Van Alst to win his 15th ARCA Menards Series career win, his seventh of the season, and his second consecutive win. To fill out the podium, Heim would come back to finish third.

Background 
Winchester Speedway is a half-mile paved oval motor racetrack in White River Township, Randolph County, just outside Winchester, Indiana, approximately 90 miles (145 km) northeast of Indianapolis. It seats 4000 spectators. It is also known as the "World's Fastest 1/2 mile". 

The track's 37 degree banking is one of the steepest in motorsports, and the highest-banked active racetrack in the country. Notable drivers that raced at Winchester include Rusty Wallace, Mark Martin, Jeff Gordon, Tony Stewart, Ryan Newman, Sarah Fisher and Chase Briscoe.

Entry list

Practice 
The only 45-minute practice session was held on Saturday, July 31, at 4:15 PM EST.

Qualifying 
Qualifying was held on Saturday, July 31, at 6:00 PM EST. Each driver would have two laps to set a fastest time- the fastest of the two would count as their official lap time.

No drivers would fail to qualify.

Full qualifying results

Race results

References 

2021 ARCA Menards Series
Calypso Lemonade 200
Calypso Lemonade 200